The Task may refer to:

 The Task (poem), a 1785 poem by William Cowper
 The Task (film), a 2011 horror film directed by Alex Orwell
 The Mission (play), a 1979 drama by Heiner Müller